Armand Louis Napoleon Trudel (July 21, 1912 – March 19, 1971) was an American-born Canadian professional ice hockey player.

Early life
Trudel was born in Salem, Massachusetts to Canadian parents who had moved there from Montreal. When he was a small child, his family migrated to Edmonton, Alberta where he started to play junior hockey.

Professional career
Lou Trudel played 305 games in the National Hockey League with the Montreal Canadiens and Chicago Black Hawks. Trudel won two Stanley Cups with the Chicago Black Hawks in 1934 and 1938.

Post playing career
Trudel coached the Milwaukee Chiefs during the 1953–54 season.

References

External links

1912 births
1971 deaths
American emigrants to Canada
Canadian ice hockey left wingers
Chicago Blackhawks players
Ice hockey people from Massachusetts
Montreal Canadiens players
Ice hockey people from Edmonton
Sportspeople from Salem, Massachusetts
Stanley Cup champions